Zohan District is a district (bakhsh) in Zirkuh County, South Khorasan Province, Iran. At the 2006 census, its population was 11,926, in 3,150 families.  The District has one city: Zohan.  The District has two rural districts (dehestan): Afin Rural District and Zohan Rural District.

References 

Districts of South Khorasan Province
Zirkuh County